The LSU–Mississippi State football rivalry, sometimes informally known as “Cowbells vs Cajuns” is an American college football rivalry between the LSU Tigers and Mississippi State Bulldogs. Both universities are founding members of the Southeastern Conference (SEC), and are currently members of the SEC West with a total of 113 meetings. This rivalry is LSU's longest and Mississippi State's second behind the Egg Bowl against the University of Mississippi. LSU leads the series 74–38–3.

History 
From 1923 to 1930, every game was played in the state of Mississippi, and LSU hosted every game from 1934 to 1957, and only four games in the series were played outside of Baton Rouge from 1934 to 1973 in order for State to realize a larger gate by playing at Tiger Stadium, which had a much larger capacity than the Bulldogs' home fields in Starkville and Jackson.

When the SEC expanded in 1992, the matchup with LSU and Mississippi State was not played in November like it had since 1947 and has only been played once in the month of November since.

LSU has dominated most of the series since 1985 losing only six games with the most current loss in 2020, when the then-unranked Bulldogs defeated #6 LSU in Baton Rouge, 44-34.

Notable games 
1982: LSU came to Starkville 7-0-1 and ranked No. 6 in the Associated Press poll following a 20-10 victory vs. Alabama in Birmingham, but the Bulldogs defeated the Tigers 27-24. It was the first time LSU visited Starkville since 1923. 
1986: LSU's 47-0 rout at Jackson clinched the Tigers' first SEC championship since 1970. 
1991: William "Sleepy" Robinson led Mississippi State to a 28-19 victory in Tiger Stadium. LSU's Todd Kinchen had a then-school record 248 receiving yards in the loss.
1999: The #7 Bulldogs gutted out a 17-16 win over the Tigers at Scott Field. Rod Gibson the clinching touchdown in closing minutes.
2000: After falling behind 31-17, the Tigers rallied to beat the Bulldogs 45-38 in overtime.
2009: Mississippi State outgained the Tigers by over 100 yards and drove down to the 1 yard line in the final minute, but a goal-line stand by LSU saved the lead for a 30-26 Tiger win.
2014: Dak Prescott led the then-unranked Bulldogs to a 34-29 upset in Baton Rouge, snapping the Tigers' 14-game win streak in the series. The Bulldogs actually led 34-10 in the fourth quarter, but LSU scored 3 late touchdowns to almost close the gap. However, the Tigers' Hail Mary on the final play was intercepted by Will Redmond. Josh Robinson ran for 197 yards for the Bulldogs. This was Mississippi State's first win over LSU since 1999, and their first on the road in Baton Rouge since 1991. Mississippi State reached #1 in the rankings a few weeks later, and finished 10-3 on the season.
2016: LSU's 23-20 victory turned out not only to be coach Les Miles' last game in Tiger Stadium, but also the last of his 114 victories at LSU. Miles was fired eight days later, one day after LSU lost 18-13 at Auburn. 
2017: LSU came into Starkville ranked #12 under first-year head coach Ed Orgeron, but it was the unranked Bulldogs who won in a 37-7 rout. Nick Fitzgerald threw two touchdown passes and ran in two more, and the Bulldogs outgained the Tigers 465-270. It was also the first win over LSU at home in Starkville for the Bulldogs since 1999 and the first time they beat a ranked LSU team there since 1984.
2020: Mike Leach, in his coaching debut for the Bulldogs, pulled one of the more memorable upsets in recent school history. Mississippi State entered the game as an 18-point underdog against defending national champion LSU. Instead, the Bulldogs upset the Tigers in Death Valley, 44–34. Mississippi State QB K. J. Costello threw for an SEC and school record 623 yards. LSU threw the ball heavily as well, with QB Myles Brennan throwing for 325 yards and 3 TDs. The Tigers had their 16-game win streak broken and became the first defending champions to lose a season opener since Michigan in 1998.
2022: Brian Kelly, in his SEC debut for the Tigers, led the team to a 31-16 comeback victory in Tiger Stadium. LSU Nickel Back Jay Ward earned SEC Defensive Player of the Week honors following his impressive performance. Ward finished with 11 tackles, along with 1.5 tackles for loss and the game-sealing interception.

Game results

See also 
 List of NCAA college football rivalry games
 List of most-played college football series in NCAA Division I

References

College football rivalries in the United States
LSU Tigers football
Mississippi State Bulldogs football